Maestri is a surname of Italian origin. Notable people with the surname include: 

 Alex Maestri (born 1985), Italian baseball player
 Ambrogio Maestri (born 1970), Italian operatic baritone
 Anna Maestri (1924–1988), Italian actress
 Cesare Maestri (born 1929), Italian mountaineer
 Cesare Maestri (runner) (born 1993), Italian runner
 Don Maestri (born 1946), American college basketball coach
 Flavio Maestri (born 1973), Peruvian soccer player
 George Maestri, creative director of Rubber Bug animation studio 
 Guy Maestri (born 1974), Australian contemporary artist
 Luca Maestri (born 1963), chief financial officer at Apple Inc
 Hector Maestri (1935–2014), Cuban baseball player
 Michelangelo Maestri (died  1812), Italian artist
 Mirco Maestri (born 1991), Italian cyclist
 Riccardo Maestri (born 1994),  Italian swimmer
 Robert Maestri (1899–1974), mayor of New Orleans
 Ron Maestri, American college baseball coach
 Walter Maestri (died 2017), American sociologist, academic administrator, and emergency manager
 Yoann Maestri (born 1988), French rugby player

Italian-language surnames